Dublin Murders is a crime drama television series created by Sarah Phelps. It is based on the Dublin Murder Squad books by Tana French, commissioned by the BBC for BBC One and Starz, with RTÉ later joining the project. The first series, consisting of eight episodes, is adapted from In the Woods (2007) and The Likeness (2008).

Broadcast began on BBC One on 14 October 2019, on RTÉ One on 16 October 2019, and on Starz on 10 November 2019. The series ended in the UK with episode 8, broadcast on 5 November 2019, watched by 4.58 million UK viewers. In January 2020 it was reported that Starz is in talks for a second series.

Cast

Main
 Killian Scott as Rob Reilly
 Sarah Greene as Cassie Maddox
 Michael D'Arcy as Adam Reilly
 Tom Vaughan-Lawlor as Frank Mackey
 Eugene O'Hare as (Det.) Quigley
 Moe Dunford as Sam O'Neill
 Ellie O'Halloran as Jamie Rowan
 Niall Jordan as Peter Savage
 Ian Kenny as (Gda.) Phelan

Recurring
 Conleth Hill as (Superintendent) O'Kelly
 Peter McDonald as Jonathan Devlin
 Amy Macken as Katy and Jessica Devlin
 Leah McNamara as Rosalind Devlin
 Jonny Holden as Damien Donnelly
 Sam Keeley as Daniel March
 Antonio Aakeel as Raphael "Rafe" Hyland
 Charlie Kelly as Justin Mannering
 Vanessa Emme as Abigail "Abby" Stone
 Alexandra Moen as Simone Cameron
 Kathy Monahan as Margaret Devlin
 Ericka Roe as Alannah Shorey
 Florence Ordesh as Mel Royce
 Ned Dennehy as pathologist

Production

Development
Dublin Murders was commissioned by British public service broadcaster BBC for BBC One, and Starz, with Irish public service broadcaster RTÉ later joining the project. Produced by Euston Films, a part of the Fremantle Media group, FremantleMedia International handles international rights. Sarah Phelps wrote the screenplay which is based on In the Woods and The Likeness, two books written by Tana French. Carmel Maloney produced the series. Sarah Phelps, Kate Harwood, Noemi Spanos, Ed Guiney, Alan Gasmer, Peter Jaysen, Elizabeth Kilgariff, Saul Dibb and Tommy Bulfin are executive producers.

Filming
Filming commenced in 2018 in Belfast and Dublin and continued in Dublin to late February 2019.

Episodes

Broadcast
The series consists of eight episodes, and was also acquired by Starz for airing in the US and Canada, while StarzPlay holds broadcasting rights for Germany, France, Italy, Spain and Brazil. Dublin Murders debuted on BBC One on 14 October 2019, on RTÉ One on 16 October 2019, and on Starz on 10 November 2019.

Notes

References

External links
 
 

2010s British crime drama television series
2020s British crime drama television series
2019 British television series debuts
2019 Irish television series debuts
BBC high definition shows
BBC television dramas
Irish crime television series
Starz original programming
English-language television shows
Television shows based on Irish novels
Television series by Euston Films
Television series by Fremantle (company)
Television series set in 2006
Television shows set in Dublin (city)
Television shows set in the Republic of Ireland
Tana French